Bad Monkey is an upcoming American television drama created and executive produced by Bill Lawrence. A co-production between Warner Bros. Television and Doozer Productions, it is based on the 2013 novel of the same name by Carl Hiaasen. The series is led by Vince Vaughn, Michelle Monaghan, Jodie Turner-Smith, Meredith Hagner, Rob Delaney, Natalie Martinez, L. Scott Caldwell, Ronald Peet, and John Ortiz. Charlotte Lawrence and Alex Moffat also star in recurring roles.

Bad Monkey is scheduled to be released in the United States on Apple TV+.

Premise
Andrew Yancy is a one-time detective demoted to restaurant inspector in Southern Florida. A severed arm found by a tourist pulls Yancy into the world of greed and corruption that decimates the land and environment in both Florida and the Bahamas.

Cast

Main

 Vince Vaughn as Andrew Yancy, a one-time detective turned restaurant inspector
 Michelle Monaghan as Bonnie, a woman in an abusive marriage with a secret past
 Jodie Turner-Smith as Dragon Queen/Gracie, a Obeah–practicing woman living in Andros, Bahamas
 Meredith Hagner as Eve, the wife of drowning victim Nick Stripling
 Rob Delaney as Christopher, Eve's boyfriend
 Natalie Martinez as Rosa, a medical examiner from Miami who helps Yancy
 L. Scott Caldwell as YaYa, Dragon Queen's grandmother
 Ronald Peet as Neville, a young Bahamian fisherman
 John Ortiz as Rogelio, a police detective and Yancy's best friend

Recurring
 Charlotte Lawrence as Caitlin, a model, recovering addict, and Eve's stepdaughter
 Alex Moffat as Evan Shook, a real estate developer designing a mansion next to Yancy's property

Episodes

Production
In December 2018, Bill Lawrence's Doozer Productions signed an eight-figure five-year overall deal with Warner Bros. Television. In August 2021, the two studios announced the development of Bad Monkey, a 10-episode drama series based on the 2013 novel of the same name by Carl Hiaasen, with Vince Vaughn starring and Apple TV+ distributing. In December 2021, Michelle Monaghan, Jodie Turner-Smith, and Meredith Hagner joined the cast. In January 2022, Ana Villafañe, Rob Delaney, Ahmed Elhaj, Arturo Luis Soria, and Alex Moffat were added to the cast. In March 2022, Natalie Martinez was cast as a series regular to replace Villafañe because, according to Deadline Hollywood, "the character had been written older than Villafañe's age, leading to the decision to replace her." In April, L. Scott Caldwell and Charlotte Lawrence were reported to star, with Ronald Peet taking over Elhaj's role. In June, it was announced John Ortiz had been cast to replace Soria in the series.

Filming began in February 2022 under the working title Marcel. Shooting took place in the Florida Keys and Miami, Florida. Filming locations included Duval Street, Key West.

References

External links
 

Upcoming drama television series
2020s American drama television series
Apple TV+ original programming
English-language television shows
Television shows based on American novels
Television series by Warner Bros. Television Studios
Television shows set in Florida
Television shows filmed in Miami
Television shows filmed in Florida